John Round (8 March 1783 – 28 April 1860) was an English banker and Conservative Party politician.

He was the eldest surviving son of barrister John Round, of Colchester and was educated at Gray's Inn (1800) and Balliol College, Oxford (1801–05).

He was Member of Parliament (MP) for Ipswich from 1812 to 1818, and for Maldon from 1837 to 1847. He was High Steward of Colchester from 1818 to his death and appointed High Sheriff of Essex for 1834–35.

He married Susan Constantia, the daughter of George Caswall of Sacombe Park, Hertfordshire, with whom he had 3 sons and 2 daughters. His grandson John Horace Round was a historian and genealogist of medieval England.

References

External links 
 

1783 births
1860 deaths
Alumni of Balliol College, Oxford
Members of Gray's Inn
Conservative Party (UK) MPs for English constituencies
Members of the Parliament of the United Kingdom for Ipswich
UK MPs 1812–1818
UK MPs 1837–1841
UK MPs 1841–1847
High Sheriffs of Essex
Members of Parliament for Maldon